Kakoulou is a village and principal settlement (chef-lieu) of the commune of Logo in the Cercle of Kayes in the Kayes Region of south-western Mali.

References

Populated places in Kayes Region